List of Orthodox Archbishops of Akhalkalaki of the Georgian Orthodox and Apostolic Church:

 Nikolozi Pachuashvili (present)

See also
 List of Eastern Orthodox bishops and archbishops

References

Georgian Orthodox Church
Eastern Orthodox archbishops
Eastern Orthodoxy-related lists